Maria Nardi (born 15 January 1935) is an Italian former  freestyleswimmer. She competed in two events at the 1952 Summer Olympics.

References

External links
 

1935 births
Living people
Italian female freestyle swimmers
Olympic swimmers of Italy
Swimmers at the 1952 Summer Olympics
Sportspeople from Ravenna